Dégnékoro  is a rural commune and village in the Cercle of Dioila in the Koulikoro Region of southern Mali.

References

External links
.

Communes of Koulikoro Region